Humbercourt is a commune in the Somme department in Hauts-de-France in northern France.

Geography
To the north is the Bois de Dessus, but for the most part, the district is flat farm land.

History
Linked with the seigneurs of the House of Brimeu, whose coats of arms adorn the church porch, along with the Toison d'Or awarded to Jean De Brimeu for his services to the duke, Charles the Bold.

Population

See also
Communes of the Somme department

References

Communes of Somme (department)